Michael Dinner (born May 20, 1953) is an American director, producer, and screenwriter for television.

Biography
Prior to his TV career, Dinner was a singer-songwriter and recording artist for Fantasy Records, where he released two albums, The Great Pretender (1974) and Tom Thumb the Dreamer (1976), along with four singles.

In 2017, he wrote and directed an episode of the Channel 4/Amazon Video series Philip K. Dick's Electric Dreams. He also served as an executive producer.

Directed
Heaven Help Us (1985)
Off Beat (1986)
Hot to Trot (1988)
The Wonder Years (19 episodes, 1989–1993)
Thicker Than Blood: The Larry McLinden Story (TV Movie, 1994)
Chicago Hope (5 episodes, 1994–1995)
Early Edition (3 episodes, 1996–1997)
The Crew (2000)
Karen Sisco (2 episodes, 2003)
Invasion (1 episode, 2005)
Grey's Anatomy (1 episode, 2005)
Kidnapped (2 episodes, 2006)
Sons of Anarchy (1 episode, 2008)
Law & Order (2 episodes, 2008–2009)
Justified (2 episodes, 2010; 1 episode, 2011; 1 episode, 2012; 1 episode, 2013)
Masters of Sex (2 episodes, 2013)
The Get Down (1 episode, 2016)
Sneaky Pete (2 episodes, 2017; 1 episode, 2018)
Electric Dreams (1 episode, 2018)
Blood & Treasure (1 episode, 2019)
Unbelievable (3 episodes, 2019)
Amazing Stories (1 episode, 2020)
Mayans M.C. (2 episodes, 2021)

Produced
The Wonder Years (20 episodes, 1990–1991)
Chicago Hope (28 episodes, 1994–1995) (co-executive producer)
Early Edition (1 episode, 1996) (executive producer)
Karen Sisco (1 episode, 2004) (executive producer)
Kidnapped (10 episodes, 2006–2007) (executive producer)
Justified (2 episodes, 2010; 1 episode, 2013) (executive producer)

References

External links

1953 births
American film directors
American male screenwriters
American male singer-songwriters
American television directors
American television producers
Comedy film directors
Fantasy Records artists
Living people
Primetime Emmy Award winners